Crazy Stupid Ishq is an Indian television youth drama show which premiered on 27 May 2013 on Channel V India. Produced by Sphere Origins, it starred Hiba Nawab, Aneri Vajani, Harsh Rajput and Vishal Vashishtha.

Cast

Main
Vishal Vashishtha as Ayaan Dixit
Hiba Nawab as Anushka "Pampi" Atwal
Harsh Rajput as Ishaan Dixit
Aneri Vajani as Shanaya Khan

Recurring
Kishwer Merchant as Mrs. Jasmin Atwal, Anushka's mother
Shivani Tomar as Meenal Kashyap, Ayaan's girlfriend
Ali Hassan as Mr. Nilazim Khan, Shanaya's father

References

External links

Channel V India original programming
2013 Indian television series debuts
Indian drama television series
Indian television soap operas
2013 Indian television series endings
Indian teen drama television series